Alien Olympics 2044 AD is a futuristic sports video game published by Ocean Software in 1994.

Summary

In this video game, extraterrestrials perform unorthodox Olympic-like events in the year 2044. The player gets to control one of these extraterrestrials; the player can choose up to eight different species. For example, there is a caterpillar-like alien that is very good at shooting events but terrible at racing events.

Lighter gravity allows the athletes to perform better than they would on the planet Earth. The list of possible events include: 100 Qbits Sprint, Laser Leaping, Big Bounce, Laser Skeet, 200 Qbits Splurge, Lunge Leap Splat, Toxophilly, Flob Flop, Sabre Sling, Survival, Alien Hurl, Laser Skeet 2, Jetpack Tag, Lizard Leap, and Wall Jumping.

This game is simply known as Alien Olympics in Europe. The Game Boy version explains the event to the player prior to being allowed to play it. When the game is over, the final score is displayed (at least in the Game Boy version).

Reception

References

1994 video games
DOS games
Game Boy games
Ocean Software games
Olympic video games
Video games about extraterrestrial life
Video games set in the 2040s
Video games developed in the United Kingdom